Q.T. Hush is a 1960–61 American animated cartoon released in syndication, beginning on September 24, 1960. The show's 100 three-and-a-half-minute episodes, all in color, were directed by veteran animator Rudy Cataldi, and produced by Animation Associates. The series was designed to air either as a daily five-minute cliffhanger in a locally-produced children's show, or packaged as a half-hour program. Each story was ten parts; in the daily version, the story would last for two weeks.

The main character was voiced by veteran voice actor Dallas McKennon.

This was Animation Associates' only show. All of the episodes survive.

Plot
Q.T. was a private detective with two assistants, his bloodhound Shamus (who, like Q.T., wore a deerstalker hat) and Quincy, who wore a trench coat, slouch hat and smoked cigars. Quincy was actually Q.T.'s shadow and could not only speak but slide under doors as well. As with many private eyes, Hush had a love-hate relationship with the local police in the form of Chief Muldoon.

Aside from the serial aspect and being one of the few color cartoons of its era, Q.T. was famous for inventing the cell phone (a pocket radio that could be used to call conventional land lines) and the fax machine (QT could shove documents into a phone mouthpiece and have the identical document appear in the receiver of who he was speaking with).

His initials reinforced his surname by invoking the old expression for quiet secrecy, "on the Q.T."

Characters
Q.T. Hush (Dallas McKennon) -
Shamus -
Police Chief Muldoon -
Quincy -
Scavenger Hill Mob -
Yo Yo -
Ping Pong -
Baffles -
Al Cologne -
Professor Zappo -
Gootch -
Dr. Tickle -
Mr. Snide -
One Ton -

Episodes

References

External links

Q.T. Hush at the Big Cartoon Database
Retroland: Q.T. Hush
Q.T. Hush: Old Memories
Rudy Cataldi

Hush, Q.T.
1960s American animated television series
1960 American television series debuts
1961 American television series endings
American children's animated mystery television series
Television series by CBS Studios